Thomas Doyle (born 29 June 1999) is an English rugby league footballer who plays as a  for the Keighley Cougars in Betfred Championship.  He previously played for Bradford Bulls.

Background
Doyle was born in Bradford, West Yorkshire, England. He was brought up in the youth system at the Bulls via the Bradford Bulls Academy.

Bradford Bulls
Doyle first appearance was in 2018 against Dewsbury Rams in  pre-season friendly but he did not make his first-class debut until 2019 when he played in the Championship match against Rochdale Hornets, marking his debut with two tries.  A further four league and 1895 Cup appearances followed but he did not add to his try tally.

In the 2020 season Doyle made three league appearances scoring two tries and two appearances in the Challenge Cup before the season was abandoned due to the COVID-19 pandemic.

2021 saw Doyle become the Bull's starting hooker as he made 20 appearances, all in the starting line-up and scored five tries during the season. At the end of the season Doyle signed a one year extension.

The 2022 season saw Doyle make 27 appearances in league and cup with another seven tries scored.  During the season there was speculation that Doyle was being the subject of attention from several, unspecified, Super League clubs, but at the end of the season Doyle chose to join Keighley on a two-year deal.

Statistics
Statistics do not include pre-season friendlies.

References

External links
Profile at bradfordbulls.co.uk

1999 births
Living people
Bradford Bulls players
Keighley Cougars players
English rugby league players
Rugby league hookers
Rugby league players from Bradford